The Orangeville Ice Crushers were a junior ice hockey team based in Orangeville, Ontario, Canada.  They played in the Greater Metro Junior A Hockey League (GMHL).

History
The Orangeville Americans were announced in the spring of 2011 with the roster to be composed of only American players.

On September 12, 2011, the Americans played their first game at home against the Bradford Rattlers.  The Rattlers won the game 5–2.  During this game, the first Americans' goal was scored by 16-year-old Dominic Poya from Chicago. On September 19, the Americans won their first game 7–2 at home against the Shelburne Red Wings.

On January 1, 2015, the club announced that RCR Entertainment had become the new team owners. The new ownership then renamed the team to the Orangeville Ice Crushers.

On November 15, 2016, three of the team's owners were arrested for growing and distributing marijuana including the head coach CJ Schneider. The GMHL immediately suspended those involved and named Ice Crushers shareholder Jeff Oliver as general manager and head coach.

In January 2017, the Ice Crushers website was deactivated. The Ice Crushers last played a game on January 11, losing to the Parry Sound Islanders 12–0. The team then forfeited a home game on January 18 and an away game on January 19 against the New Tecumseth Civics. The Civics reported on their social media pages that the game had been cancelled due to the Ice Crushers shutting down for the remainder of the season. The team was 7–26–0–0 before the forfeited games.

The team did not return the following season.

Season-by-season standings

Playoffs
2012 Lost quarter-final
Orangeville Americans defeated Mattawa Voyageurs 2-games-to-none
Temiscaming Titans defeated Orangeville Americans 3-games-to-none
2013 Lost division final
Orangeville Americans defeated Shelburne Red Wings 3-games-to-2
Orangeville Americans defeated Bradford Bulls 3-games-to-1
Bradford Rattlers defeated Orangeville Americans 4-games-to-none
2014 Lost division quarter-final
Alliston Coyotes defeated Orangeville Americans 3-games-to-1
2015 Lost South Conference Elimination Round 2
Orangeville Americans defeated Bradford Bulls 6–5(game)
Alliston Coyotes defeated Orangeville Americans 11–3 (game)2016 Lost Central Division 8th place qualifier
Colborne Chiefs defeated Orangeville Ice Crushers 5–3 (game)''

References

External links
Orangeville Ice Crushers 
GMHL Webpage

2011 establishments in Ontario
Ice hockey clubs established in 2011
Ice hockey teams in Ontario
Sport in Orangeville, Ontario